Halbwachs is a German-language surname. Notable people with the surname include:

Aurelie Halbwachs (born 1986), Mauritian road bicycle racer
Jeanne Halbwachs (1890-1980), French pacifist, feminist and socialist
Maurice Halbwachs (1877–1945),  French philosopher and sociologist

See also
Hallwachs

German-language surnames